The Bega Roosters are an Australian rugby league football team based in Bega, a coastal town of the Far South Coast region of New South Wales. The club was formed in 1960 as the result of the almagation of the Bega Rovers and the Bega West football clubs who were also both members of Group 16 Rugby League.

History 

After forming in 1960 from the Bega Rovers-Bega West merger, the club's first premiership came in their seventh season when Jim Gibson's men defeated Moruya 9–7 in the 1966 Grand Final.

The side then took back-to-back premierships in 1971 and 1972. The best years of the club came in the late 1980s when the side won five grand finals in six years including four straight from 1985 to 1988. The club would have to wait a decade before claiming back-to-back titles yet again in 2000 and 2001.

Name, colours, and emblem 

Bega plays in a red, blue and white predominant strip and were known as the tri-colours. Wearing a similar jersey to their NSWRL counter parts Easts (Sydney), they adopted their nickname "Roosters". The emblem is of a Rooster running with a football wearing a tri-colours jersey. The name "Bega Roosters" is inscribed underneath. This is similar to the logo of the Sydney City Roosters in the late 1990s.

Home ground  
The Bega Roosters play out of the Bega Recreation Ground for their home games.

Juniors
Matt McCoy (1945–52 Eastern Suburbs Roosters & St George Dragons)
Deon Apps (2011 South Sydney Rabbitohs)
Dale Finucane (2012– Canterbury Bulldogs & Melbourne Storm)
Kezie Apps (2018– St George Illawarra Dragons)

Honours

Team 

 Group 16 Rugby League Premierships: 12
  1966, 1971, 1972, 1985, 1986, 1987, 1988, 1990, 2000, 2001, 2014, 2022
 Group 16 Rugby League Runners-Up: 15
 1967, 1970, 1979, 1981, 1983, 1991, 1994, 2008, 2010, 2011, 2013, 2015, 2016, 2018, 2019
 Clayton Cup: One
1988

Individual

See also

 Country Rugby League
 Group 16 Rugby League

References

External links 
 Bega Roosters Homepage
 Country Rugby League Homepage
 Group 16 Rugby League Homepage

Rugby clubs established in 1960
Rugby league teams in New South Wales
Bega Valley Shire